Candler-McAfee is a census-designated place in unincorporated DeKalb County, Georgia, United States.

Geography

Candler-McAfee is located to the east of the city of Atlanta, Georgia and is bounded by:
 North: Glenwood Avenue
 West: 2nd Avenue
 South: I-20
 East: I-285

The Belvedere Park CDP is to the north and Panthersville CDP is to the south.

Landmarks
The area is home to DeKalb Fire Station 26 and its water tower.
East Lake Golf Club is on the northern boundary of Candler-McAfee

Demographics

2020 census

As of the 2020 United States census, there were 22,468 people, 8,685 households, and 5,191 families residing in the CDP.

2000 census
As of the census of 2000, there were 28,294 people, 9,030 households, and 6,926 families residing in the CDP. The racial makeup of the CDP was 3.31% White, 95.17% African American, 0.20% Native American, 0.15% Asian, 0.01% Pacific Islander, 0.41% from other races, and 0.76% from two or more races. Hispanic or Latino of any race were 0.93% of the population.

There were 9,030 households, out of which 32.7% had children under the age of 18 living with them, 36.9% were married couples living together, 33.1% had a female householder with no husband present, and 23.3% were non-families. 18.2% of all households were made up of individuals, and 3.4% had someone living alone who was 65 years of age or older.  The average household size was 3.08 and the average family size was 3.46.

In the CDP, the population was spread out, with 28.0% under the age of 18, 10.7% from 18 to 24, 28.2% from 25 to 44, 25.7% from 45 to 64, and 7.5% who were 65 years of age or older.  The median age was 33 years. For every 100 females, there were 87.0 males.  For every 100 females age 18 and over, there were 81.7 males.

At the height of the mortgage crisis, in 2007, the CDP poverty rate exploded to 27.5%, one of the highest rates in the country . The years since have seen improvement; the median income for a household in the CDP was $38,152 in recent data as of 2020, and the median income for a family was $40,368. Males had a median income of $30,218 versus $25,887 for females. The per capita income for the CDP was $15,092.  About 10.9% of families and 13.6% of the population were below the poverty line, including 17.1% of those under age 18 and 14.9% of those age 65 or over.

Neighborhoods
Neighborhoods in the CDP:
 East Lake Terrace, between Glenwood (N), McAfee (S), Parker (W) and Candler (E)
 Mark Trail Park
 Eastwyck Village
 Columbia Valley
 Glendale Park
 Springwoods
 Spring Valley

Education
It is in the DeKalb County Public Schools. Zoned schools:
 Elementary schools: Columbia, Kelley Lake, Ronald E. McNair, Snapfinger, and Toney (all in the CDP)
 Middle schools: Ronald E. McNair (in the CDP) and Columbia (outside the CDP)
 High schools: Columbia High School (in the CDP) and Ronald E. McNair High School (outside the CDP).

The Roman Catholic Archdiocese of Atlanta operates area Catholic schools. The K-8 school St. Peter Claver Regional School is in Candler-McAfee.

References

Census-designated places in DeKalb County, Georgia
Census-designated places in the Atlanta metropolitan area
Unincorporated communities in DeKalb County, Georgia